Kibi or Kyebi is a town and the capital of the East Akim Municipal District, a district in the Eastern Region of south Ghana, on the eastern slopes of the Atewa Range. Kibi lies at an altitude of 318 m and, in 2013, had a population of 11,677 people.

Transport

Train
Kibi is served at a short distance by a station on the Ghana rail transport network.

History
Kibi is the traditional capital of the Akyem Abuakwa state in Eastern region of Ghana (also known as Okyeman). The Ofori Panin paramount stool which is the traditional seat of the Okyenhene is located in Kibi.

Education 
Kibi has a number of educational institutions from primary education to higher education and Kibi also has a school for the deaf, founded in 1975, which by 2008 had 213 students.

Economy
Tarkwaian rocks, a major source of gold, have been found near Kibi. Several mining companies including Paramount Mining Corporation have been exploring their potential. RUSAL, a major Russian Aluminium applied to the Ghana Minerals Commission and the Ghana Integrated Aluminium Industry Committee for permission to explore the Ghana bauxite deposits near Kibi. The town is known for a lot of galamsey activities and these activities has led to the contamination of river Birim.

Health 

 Kibi Government Hospital

Railway station
In Kibi, there is a railway station, Kibi railway station.

See also
 Railway stations in Ghana

Personalities
Abedi Pele
Nana Akufo-Addo, President of Ghana
André Ayew
Jordan Ayew
Nana Asante Bediatuo
Osagyefuo Amoatia Ofori Panin
Kofi Asante Ofori-Atta, Former Attorney General and Speaker of Parliament
William Ofori-Atta, Former Foreign Minister, Former Minister of Education, and Former Chairman of Council Of State
Jones Ofori-Atta, Former Deputy Finance Minister
Kwesi Amoako-Atta, First Black Deputy Governor of Bank of Ghana and Former Finance Minister of Ghana
Susan Ofori-Atta, First Female Medical Doctor in Ghana
 S.S. Omane, Former Inspector General of Police, IGP
 Samuel Atta Akyea, MP for Akyem Abuakwa South
 Ofori-Atta I

References

Populated places in the Eastern Region (Ghana)